The 2000–01 season was Burnley's 1st season in the second tier of English football since 1994/95. They were managed by Stan Ternent in his third full season since he replaced Chris Waddle at the beginning 1998–99 campaign.

Appearances and goals

|}

Transfers

In

Out

Matches

First Division

Final league position

League Cup

1st Round First Leg

1st Round Second Leg

2nd Round First Leg

2nd Round Second Leg

FA Cup

3rd Round

3rd Round Replay

References

2000-01
Burn